Judy of the Jungle is a fictional character from the Golden Age of Comics; she appeared in comic books published by Nedor Comics.  She first appeared in print in Exciting Comics #55 (May 1947).

Judy is raised by her naturalist father in the African jungle. When he's shot, she avenges his death, and becomes a jungle girl hero. Her love interest is American G-man Pistol Roberts. She's assisted by her animal friends Chan (a monkey), Tanda (an elephant) and Kala (a black panther). According to Jess Nevins' Encyclopedia of Golden Age Superheroes, "she fights white murderers from outside the jungle, a Lost City of Pharaonic cultists, white treasure-hunters in search of Lobengula's treasure, the tribe of U'bongo, the Leopard Queen, and so on".

Publication history
Judy appeared as a regular backup feature in Exciting Comics, displacing Miss Masque. She soon began appearing on the covers, with art provided by Alex Schomburg. Some of Judy's stories featured early work by Frank Frazetta.  Judy's last Golden Age appearance was in Exciting Comics #69 (September 1949).

AC Comics reprinted several of Judy's adventures in 1993 and 1999.

Notes

Golden Age adventure heroes
Jungle girls
Jungle superheroes
Nedor Comics superheroes
Comics characters introduced in 1947